The 1953 All-Ireland Senior Hurling Championship was the 67th staging of the All-Ireland hurling championship since its establishment by the Gaelic Athletic Association in 1887. The championship began on 3 May 1953 and ended on 7 September 1953.

Cork were the defending champions, and retained their All-Ireland crown following a 3-3 to 0-8 defeat of Galway in the final.

Teams

Team summaries

Results

Leinster Senior Hurling Championship

First round

Second round

Semi-finals

Final

Munster Senior Hurling Championship

First round

Semi-finals

Final

All-Ireland Senior Hurling Championship

Semi-final

Final

Championship statistics

Top scorers

Top scorers overall

Top scorers in a single game

Scoring

Widest winning margin: 34 points 
Clare 10-8 - 1-1 Limerick (Munster quarter-final, 14 June 1953)
Most goals in a match: 11 
Clare 10-8 - 1-1 Limerick (Munster quarter-final, 14 June 1953)
Most points in a match: 21 
Cork 3-10 - 1-11 Tipperary (Munster final, 26 July 1953)
Most goals by one team in a match: 10 
Clare 10-8 - 1-1 Limerick (Munster quarter-final, 14 June 1953)
Most goals scored by a losing team: 4 
Clare 4-2 - 2-11 Cork (Munster semi-final, 28 June 1953)
Most points scored by a losing team: 11 
Tipperary 1-11 - 3-10 Cork (Munster final, 26 July 1953)

Miscellaneous

 Clare's 10-8 to 1-1 defeat of Limerick in the Munster quarter-final was a record-breaking game. It was Clare's first championship defeat of their near rivals since 1914. The 34-point winning margin remains a record between these two teams. Jimmy Smyth of Clare scored a Munster championship record of 6-4 against Limerick.

Sources

 Corry, Eoghan, The GAA Book of Lists (Hodder Headline Ireland, 2005).
 Donegan, Des, The Complete Handbook of Gaelic Games (DBA Publications Limited, 2005).
 Horgan, Tim, Christy Ring: Hurling's Greatest (The Collins Press, 2007).
 Nolan, Pat, Flashbacks: A Half Century of Cork Hurling (The Collins Press, 2000).
 Sweeney, Éamonn, Munster Hurling Legends (The O'Brien Press, 2002).

External links
 1953 All-Ireland Senior Hurling Championship results

References

1956